Edwin Joseph "Husky" Walczak  (September 21, 1915 – March 10, 1998) was a Major League Baseball (MLB) player. Born in West Warwick, Rhode Island, he played with the Philadelphia Phillies in September of the 1945 season. He batted and threw right-handed.

After processing out of the Army Air Forces as a sergeant in August 1945, Walczak joined the Phillies and earned a starting role at second base in the final month of the season. September 1945 would be his only month as an MLB player; he spent the remainder of his professional baseball career (1946–50) in the minor leagues.

Walczak died on March 10, 1998, in Norwich, Connecticut, aged 82.

References

External links

1915 births
1998 deaths
Baseball players from Rhode Island
Major League Baseball second basemen
People from West Warwick, Rhode Island
Philadelphia Phillies players
American people of Polish descent
Mooresville Moors players
Utica Blue Jays players
Newton-Conover Twins players
United States Army Air Forces personnel of World War II
United States Army Air Forces soldiers